Tilefonise mou (Greek: Τηλεφώνησέ Μου; English: Call Me) is the twenty-first studio album by Greek singer Vasilis Karras.

It was released on 17 January 1996 by Minos EMI and received double platinum status, selling over 120,000 units in Greece. It's the first collaboration of Vasilis Karras with songwriter Phoebus who was written (music and lyrics) entirely the album, containing many of his most successful songs, including "Gi' Afto Stasou", "Aporo An Aisthanesai Tipseis", "Tilefonise Mou" and "Eho Anagki Na Vgo".

Track listing

Credits

Personnel 
Eleni Antoniadou: backing vocals

Giannis Bithikotsis: baglama (tracks: 3, 6, 8, 10) || bouzouki (tracks: 2, 3, 6, 8, 9) || tzoura (tracks: 1, 3, 4, 10)

Rania Dizikiriki: backing vocals

Vaggelis Giannopoulos: backing vocals (tracks: 1, 2, 3, 4, 6, 7, 9, 10, 11)

Antonis Gounaris: guitars

Katerina Kiriakou: backing vocals

Giorgos Kostoglou: bass

Fedon Lionoudakis: accordion (tracks: 1, 6, 8)

Andreas Mouzakis: drums

Alex Panagis: backing vocals (tracks: 1, 2, 3, 4, 6, 7, 8, 9, 10, 11)

Phoebus: backing vocals (tracks: 1, 2, 3, 4, 6, 7, 8, 9, 10, 11) || keyboards, orchestration, programming

Giorgos Roilos: harmonica (tracks: 7) || percussion (tracks: 1, 2, 4, 6, 7, 10, 11)

Manolis Samaras: backing vocals (tracks: 1, 2, 3, 4, 6, 7, 9, 10, 11)

Thanasis Vasilopoulos: clarinet (tracks: 9) || ney (tracks: 4, 5)

Production 
Thodoris Chrisanthopoulos (Fabelsound): transfer

Giannis Chronopoulos: sound engineer

Giannis Ioannidis (D.P.H.): mastering

Vaggelis Papadopoulos: mix engineer, sound engineer

Panagiotis Rizopoulos: sound engineer

Frank Wönne: assistant sound engineer

Cover 
Achilleas Charitos: styling

Ntinos Diamantopoulos: photographer [cover]

Manolis Kalogeropoulos: photographer [studio]

Maria Pitsokou: art direction

Credits adapted from the album's liner notes.

Chart performance

References

1996 albums
Minos EMI albums